Club Citta (often stylized as CLUB CITTA') is a 1,300-capacity live music venue located in Kawasaki, Kanagawa, Japan. The club opened in 1988 and has hosted many famous artists, such as The Exploited, L.A. Guns, Black Sabbath, Ramones, Red Hot Chili Peppers, Beastie Boys, Radiohead, Mano Negra, Rammstein, Les Rallizes Denudes, Lenny Kravitz, Jamiroquai, Manic Street Preachers, Green Day, Europe, and Nirvana.

References

External links
 Official website

Music venues in Japan
Buildings and structures in Kawasaki, Kanagawa
Music venues completed in 1988
1988 establishments in Japan